Holenberg is a municipality in the district of Holzminden, in Lower Saxony, Germany.

References

Holzminden (district)